The New Zealand Threat Classification System is used by the Department of Conservation to assess conservation priorities of species in New Zealand.

The system was developed because the IUCN Red List, a similar conservation status system, had some shortcomings for the unique requirements of conservation ranking in New Zealand.   plants, animals, and fungi are evaluated, though the lattermost has yet to be published.  Algae were assessed in 2005 but not reassessed since.  Other protists have not been evaluated.

Categories 
Species that are ranked are assigned categories:

Threatened
This category has three major divisions:
Nationally Critical - equivalent to the IUCN category of Critically endangered
Nationally Endangered - equivalent to the IUCN category of Endangered
Nationally Vulnerable - equivalent to the IUCN category of Vulnerable

At Risk
This has four categories:
Declining
Recovering
Relict
Naturally Uncommon

Other categories
Introduced and Naturalised
These are any species that are deliberately or accidentally introduced into New Zealand.

Migrant
Migrant species are those that visit New Zealand as part of their life cycle.

Vagrant
Vagrants are taxa that are rare in New Zealand that have made their own way and do not breed successfully.

Coloniser
These taxa have arrived in New Zealand without human help and reproduce successfully.

Data Deficient
This category lists taxa for which insufficient information is available to make as assessment on conservation status.

Extinct
Taxa for which there is no reasonable doubt that no individuals exist are ranked as extinct.  For these lists only species that have become extinct since 1840 are listed.

Not Threatened
If taxa fit into none of the other categories they are listed in the Not Threatened category.

Qualifiers
A series of qualifiers are used to give additional information on the threat classification:

See also
Conservation in New Zealand

References

External links
Department of Conservation's New Zealand Threat Classification System website
NZTCS Database 
New Zealand Threat Classification System past conservation status lists and manuals

Nature conservation in New Zealand
Biota by conservation status system